Hlíðarendi is a famous place in Icelandic historical literature. Gunnar Hámundarson from Njála used to live in Hlíðarendi at Fljótshlíð and there was a manor house and churchground.

References

Viking Age populated places